Guntis Peders (born 15 August 1973 in Valmiera) is a retired Latvian athlete who specialised in the high hurdles. His biggest success is the silver medal at the 1996 European Indoor Championships in Stockholm, where his country, thanks to him and Igors Kazanovs, for the first time won two medals in one event. In addition, he represented Latvia at the 1996 Summer Olympics, as well as 1995 and 1997 World Championships.

He retired from professional athletics after the 1999 season.

His personal bests are 13.47 seconds in the 110 metres hurdles (Tallinn 1996) and 7.65 seconds in the indoor 60 metres hurdles (Stockholm 1996).

Competition record

References

External links
 
 

1973 births
Living people
Latvian male hurdlers
Athletes (track and field) at the 1996 Summer Olympics
Olympic athletes of Latvia
People from Valmiera